Flee is an album by British blues rock musician Jeremy Spencer credited as "The Jeremy Spencer Band"  with particularly strong input from Michael Fogarty. Spencer had been a member of Fleetwood Mac from 1967–71, and this 1979 release was Spencer's third album apart from Fleetwood Mac, and his second recorded while a member of the Children of God.

Background
Spencer was living in Italy in 1977, and had begun to write new songs and work towards forming a new band. He was joined there by Michael Fogarty, whom Spencer considered the perfect partner for his new musical venture, the two having met in the UK in 1975. Fogarty was born in Tennessee in 1951, and had spent the previous ten years playing in a number of soul and country groups.

This was Spencer's first recorded work in seven years, and was musically far removed from his previous work. It showed his continuing preference for parodying other bands; in this case the songs on Side 2 bear a strong resemblance to the contemporary sound of Fleetwood Mac, i.e. a breezy Californian rock style with female vocalists, and a solid thumping drum sound reminiscent of Mick Fleetwood. A coincidence seems unlikely given Spencer's past membership of that band, with the fact that his female backing vocalists are credited as "The Songbirds" – "Songbird" was a very popular Fleetwood Mac song from the Rumours album just a couple of years earlier.

Spencer and Fogarty sang on several tracks, but for the hit single "Cool Breeze", the lead vocal was taken by Jeanne Hendricks. Hendricks performed on a number of tracks, and was featured in the album photographs, but was not credited as a vocalist. She also sang with Spencer on the follow-up single, "Travellin'".

The album features a heavy disco production treatment given to the songs on Side 1, which Spencer was very unhappy with. "Sunshine" was a reworking of "When I Looked to See the Sunshine" from the Jeremy Spencer and the Children album of 1972.

"Cool Breeze" and "Travellin'" were issued as singles in various territories, and "Cool Breeze" charted at Number 21 on the U.S. Billboard Adult Contemporary Charts, although the album was not a commercial success.

"Flee" was reworked by Spencer as "Refugees" for his 2012 album Bend in the Road.

Track listing
Side One:
"Deeper" (David Rugely)
"Sunshine" (Jeremy Spencer)
"Love Our Way Outta Here" (Michael Fogarty)

Side Two:
"Flee" (Spencer, Fogarty)
"Cool Breeze" (Fogarty, Spencer)
"You've Got the Right" (Fogarty, Spencer)
"Travellin'" (Fogarty, Spencer)

Personnel
The Jeremy Spencer Band
Jeremy Spencer – vocals, guitar
Michael Fogarty – keyboards, vocals
Jeanne Hendricks – vocals on side 2, lead vocal on "Cool Breeze"
Jeff Schoen – keyboards
Neil Jason – bass guitar
Al Izzo – drums
Buzz Buchanan – drums
Victor "Coco" Salazar – percussion
"The Songbirds" – backing vocals on side 1

Production
Produced by Jeremy Spencer and Michael Fogarty
Executive producer – Ahmet Ertegün
Tracks 1–3 produced in association with Silvio Tancredi and Israel Sanchez, mixed with the use of the Aphex Aural Exciter
Tracks 1–3 arranged by Armando Noriega with vocal concepts by Phil Anastasi
Tracks 4–7 arranged by Jeremy Spencer and Michael Fogarty

References

Other reference material
Classic Rock magazine interview (by Martin Celmins), March 2006 (hosted by xFamily.org)

Jeremy Spencer albums
1979 albums
Atlantic Records albums